Louisa Jordan was a Scottish nurse.

Louisa Jordan may also refer to:

NHS Louisa Jordan Hospital in Glasgow
Louisa Jordan, a fictional character in The 39 Steps (1935 film)

See also
Louise Jordan (disambiguation)